The 2015–16 1. FC Magdeburg season is their first season in the 3. Liga.

Events
In June 2015, the club announced their pre-season plan. Later they confirmed that the friendly match against Berliner AK 07 would be played on a training pitch at MDCC-Arena, while they would face FC Viktoria Köln at the Sparkassen-Arena in nearby Bernburg. Magdeburg took part in the Kaiserstuhl-Cup where the side faced hosts Bahlinger SC and French 2014–15 Ligue 2 winners ES Troyes AC, eventually winning the cup. They would also play a match against FSV Havelberg, a club from north-eastern Saxony-Anhalt, who won the right to host in a poll held by regional newspaper Volksstimme.

Transfers

In

Out

Preseason and friendlies

3. Liga
On 2 July 2015, the German football association DFB published the preliminary schedule for the new 3. Liga season. 1. FC Magdeburg were awarded the opening game of the season to be held on Friday, 24 July, at 8.30 pm. The match will be broadcast live on television channel MDR.

3. Liga fixtures & results

League table

Saxony-Anhalt Cup

Saxony-Anhalt Cup review
In the Saxony-Anhalt Cup, Magdeburg was drawn to face Kreveser SV in the first round. This is a repeat of last season's second-round pairing which ended with a clear 9-1 victory for then-Regionalliga side.

Saxony-Anhalt Cup results

Player information

|-
|colspan="10"|Players who left the club during the 2015–16 season
|-

|}

Notes
A.   Kickoff time in Central European Time/Central European Summer Time.
B.   1. FC Magdeburg goals first.
C.  The match against Osnabrück on matchday 7 had to be postponed due to call-ups to national teams.

References

1. FC Magdeburg seasons
Magdeburg